The Rotterdam–The Hague metropolitan area is a metropolitan area encompassing the cities of Rotterdam and The Hague as well as 21 other municipalities. It was founded in 2014. The area has a population of approximately 2.7 million across . It is the largest European port, with many international organizations residing within its borders.

The area is also part of the larger urban area called Randstad. Air traffic is supported by Rotterdam-The Hague Airport offering services to a number of European cities, however the majority of air travelers use Amsterdam Airport Schiphol, which is about 45 kilometers from The Hague. RandstadRail offers light rail public transport in the area and also Rotterdam metro, The Hague tram, Rotterdam tram and the frequent trains of the Dutch railways are popular modes for public transportation within the region.

Goal 
The main reason for the cooperation is economic, to keep and make the area more attractive to international companies and organizations.

Economy 
The area has two main cores, the cities of Rotterdam and The Hague. The city of Delft is situated in between the two major cities. The area has a GDP of 170 billion Euros. There are 2700 foreign companies.

Municipalities

References

2014 establishments in the Netherlands
Metropolitan areas of the Netherlands
States and territories established in 2014